William Cunningham Smith (1871–1943) was an American academic of English literature, university administrator, and writer.

Life and career
Born in Greensboro, Smith was educated at the University of North Carolina at Chapel Hill. He attended graduate school at Harvard University and the University of Wisconsin–Madison. In 1900 he came to the State Normal and Industrial College (now the University of North Carolina at Greensboro) as a professor of English, and in 1904 he became head of the department. In 1905 Dr. Smith became Dean of the College, in 1915 Dean of the Faculty, and in 1922 Dean of the College of Liberal Arts. During his tenure at the College he was chairman of chapel and conducted devotional services. He also served as an extension lecturer.

In addition to his work as a professor, Dr. Smith was in demand as a local speaker. He taught the men's bible class at First Presbyterian Church of Greensboro, and gave a very popular series of lectures on Robert Browning under the auspices of the literature division of the Woman's Club of Greensboro. He also edited a memorial volume on Charles Duncan McIver, and was the author of a number of other publications, including Studies in American Authors, The Literary Study of the Bible, Christ the Teacher, and other articles and pamphlets concerning Bible study. 

Dr. Smith was married to Gertrude Allen of Greensboro; they had four daughters and a son. He retired in 1941 after 41 years of active service for the College.

References
Finding Aid for the William Cunningham Smith Papers, 1897-1952 The University of North Carolina at Greensboro.

1871 births
1943 deaths
American academics of English literature
University of North Carolina at Greensboro faculty
University of North Carolina at Chapel Hill alumni
Harvard University alumni
University of Wisconsin–Madison alumni